Fort San Fernando De Las Barrancas was a Spanish fort in what is now Memphis, Tennessee. Established in May 1795, the fort was erected with a garrison of 150 men to defend Spanish claims at the Fourth Chickasaw Bluff as part of a greater objective to prevent any further westward expansion by the United States. Although Spain renounced its claim to the area in Pinckney's Treaty in 1795, it occupied the fort until either 1797 or 1798, when the Spanish burned the fort and established Fort Esperanza across the river near modern Marion, Arkansas.

References

Colonial forts in Tennessee
Memphis, Tennessee
Spanish forts in the United States